Hudswell, Clarke and Company Limited was an engineering and locomotive building company in Jack Lane, Hunslet, Leeds, West Yorkshire, England.

History

The company was founded as Hudswell and Clarke in 1860.  In 1870 the name was changed to Hudswell, Clarke and Rodgers.  There was another change in 1881 to Hudswell, Clarke and Company.  The firm became a limited company in 1899.

In 1862, soon after the company had been formed, they were given the initial design work on William Hamond Bartholomew's compartment boats for the Aire and Calder Navigation. The choice of the company may have been influenced by the fact that Bartholomew, the chief engineer for the Navigation, and William Clayton, one of the founders of Hudswell and Clarke, both lived on Spencer Place in Leeds. They produced at least one of the prototype Tom Pudding compartments, but did not get the main contract for their production once the design work had been done.

As steam locomotive builders, like many of the smaller builders they specialised in small contractor's and industrial tank engines, and rarely built anything bigger than an 0-6-0T. They never built any locomotives with superheaters.

The locomotive part of the business is now part of the Hunslet Engine Company. Locomotive-building was always only one part of a diverse product inventory that included underground diesel-powered mining locomotives, hydraulic pit-props and related mining equipment.

In 1911 Hudswell Clarke entered into an agreement with Robert Hudson for the manufacture of narrow gauge locomotives.  This arrangement produced sixteen standardised designs, designated 'A' to 'Q', which ranged from four-coupled 5 hp engines to six-coupled 55 hp models. The designs were sufficiently flexible to allow for the various track gauges in use.  Over the years, 188 locomotives were supplied to these designs.

In the 1930s the company manufactured narrow gauge steam outline diesel-hydraulic locomotives for use at amusement parks around the country. In 1931  Neptune was delivered to Scarborough North Bay Railway, followed a year later by  Triton, both being  gauge. In the same year they supplied a  Robin Hood to Golden Acre Park in Leeds followed by a 4-6-2 May Thompson in 1933. They also supplied  Mary Louise and  Carol Jean to Blackpool Pleasure Beach for use on the  gauge Pleasure Beach Express in 1933. A fire in 1934 badly damaged Carol Jean so  Princess Royal was ordered as a replacement. They went on to build two more  class locomotives, Princess Elizabeth and Princess Margaret Rose for Billy Butlin to use at the Empire Exhibition in Glasgow in 1938 which were then transferred to his holiday camp in Clacton when the exhibition closed.

In later years, Hudswell Clarke designed and built diesel locomotives for both main-line and private company use, mainly for use on shunting operations.

Surviving locomotives

Steam locomotives

Diesel locomotives

Standard gauge
 British Rail Class D2/7 (none preserved)
 British Rail Class D2/12 (one preserved)
  D577/1932 Mary at Middleton Railway
  Southam (works no. D604) was outside the Great Western Country Pub and Restaurant, Bishop's Itchington, near Southam, Warwickshire in 2006 but has since left for an unknown destination
  Southam 2 (works no. D625) at Leeds Industrial Museum
  Mighty Atom (works no. D628) at Ribble Steam Railway
  Sparky (works no. D629) at Ribble Steam Railway
  Margaret (works no. D1031) at Ribble Steam Railway 
  Cadbury No. 14 (works no. D1012) was at Cadbury World. Arrived at the Statfold Barn Railway in 2022, where it is to be cosmetically restored as a "gate guardian". 
  Manchester Ship Canal 4001 Alnwick Castle (works no. D1075 of 1958) at Winfield's Store, Haslingden, Lancs
  Manchester Ship Canal 4002 Arundel Castle (works no. D1076 of 1958) at East Lancs Railway
  D631/1946 Carroll at Middleton Railway
  D707 No. 21 at the Rutland Railway
  Elland No.1 (works no. D1153) at Mangapps Railway Museum, Burnham-on-Crouch

 gauge
 Eight 145HP, 20 ton  locomotives, and twenty-four 225HP, 29 ton  locomotives, for the Sierra Leone Government Railway, supplied between 1954 and 1961. (not necessarily preserved)

 gauge
 No. D558 (built 1930) at the Moseley Railway Trust at their Apedale Valley Light Railway
 No. D564 (built 1930) at the Phyllis Rampton Trust

Steam-outline diesel locomotives
 gauge
 Neptune (1931), Scarborough North Bay Railway
 Triton (1932), Scarborough North Bay Railway
 Robin Hood (1932), Scarborough North Bay Railway
 Poseidon (1933), Scarborough North Bay Railway

 gauge
 Mary Louise (1933), Pleasure Beach Express, Blackpool
 Carol Jean (1933), Pleasure Beach Express, Blackpool
 Geoffrey Thompson OBE (1934), Pleasure Beach Express, Blackpool
 Princess Elizabeth (1938), Midland Railway - Butterley undergoing restoration.
 Princess Margaret Rose (1938), Midland Railway - Butterley

Military engineering

During the Second World War the company was one of many engineering firms that diversified into armaments. After the War, Hudswell Clarke was closely involved in various secret programmes, including the British nuclear weapon programme. The airframe (casing) for the first British nuclear bomb, Blue Danube, was manufactured by Hudswell Clarke at its Roundhay Road plant in Leeds. The Blue Danube was 24 ft long x 62 inches diameter. It was known to the RAF as "Bomb, Aircraft, HE 10,000 lb MC". Released from 45,000 ft at 500 knots (930 km/h) its maximum velocity was 2480 ft/s (Mach 2.2). It bears a likeness to the Tallboy and Grand Slam "earthquake" bombs designed by Barnes Wallis. Wallis was a consultant on the design of Blue Danube.

The airframe for Red Beard, the second generation tactical nuclear bomb was also built by Hudswell, Clarke. This tactical atomic bomb had perforated baffles to reduce bomb bay buffeting when dropped from a Canberra bomber; they were not needed on other aircraft. Red Beard was known to the RAF as "Bomb, Aircraft, HE 2'000 lb MC", although its actual weight was 1650 lb. It was deployed on a wide variety of aircraft of the RAF and Royal Navy, being stockpiled in the UK, Cyprus, Singapore and afloat on carriers.

Hudswell, Clarke also worked on Violet Club, the Interim Megaton Weapon. All the bombs detonated at the Christmas Island H-bomb tests were contained in airframes designed and built by Hudswell Clarke.  The company were also major contributors to other military projects, including the Centurion main battle tank conversion into an armoured bridgelayer, that served with the British Army for many years.  The contraction of defence manufacturing in the mid-1960s contributed to the sale and demise of the company.

Preservation 
Locations of preserved Hudswell Clarke locomotives include:

United Kingdom
Aln Valley Railway, Northumberland
Buckinghamshire Railway Centre, Quainton Road, Buckinghamshire 
Chasewater Railway, Staffordshire
East Lancashire Railway, Greater Manchester and Lancashire
Ecclesbourne Valley Railway, Derbyshire
Embsay and Bolton Abbey Steam Railway, North Yorkshire
Great Central Railway (Nottingham), Ruddington, Nottinghamshire
Keighley and Worth Valley Railway, West Yorkshire
Middleton Railway, Hunslet, West Yorkshire
Nene Valley Railway, Wansford, Cambridgeshire
North Bay Railway, Scarborough, North Yorkshire
North Norfolk Railway, Sheringham, Norfolk
Penrhyn Castle Railway Museum, Bangor, North Wales
Pontypool and Blaenavon Railway, South Wales
Ribble Steam Railway, Lancashire
Rutland Railway Museum, Cottesmore, Rutland
Statfold Barn Railway, Tamworth, Staffordshire 
Swindon and Cricklade Railway, Blunsdon, Wiltshire
Tanfield Railway, County Durham

Ireland
Railway Preservation Society of Ireland, Whitehead, Co. Antrim

New Zealand
 Oamaru Steam and Rail Restoration Society, New Zealand

Denmark
 Nordsjællands Veterantog, Græsted, Denmark
 Danmarks Tekniske Museum The Danish museum of Technology, Helsingør/Elsinore, Denmark

United States
 Edaville Railroad, Carver, Massachusetts

See also 

 List of early British private locomotive manufacturers

References 

 

Various public domain files declassified by:

 Ministry of Defence (United Kingdom)
 Ministry of Supply (and successors)
 Royal Aircraft Establishment, Farnborough

now archived in the Public Record Office, London.

External links

 Huwood-Hudswell Diesel Mines Locomotives
 Manchester Ship Canal locomotive 67
 Oamaru Steam and Rail
 
 

Locomotive manufacturers of the United Kingdom
Defunct companies based in Leeds
Manufacturing companies based in Leeds
Manufacturing companies established in 1860
Companies with year of disestablishment missing